Yakov Yan Toumarkin  (born 15 February 1992) is a Russian-born Israeli Olympic backstroke swimmer. In 2010, he was the European Junior Swimming Champion in the 100-meter backstroke.

Swimming career
In July 2010, Toumarkin won a gold medal in the 100-meter backstroke (55.20) and a bronze medal in the 200 m backstroke (2:01.14) at the 2010 European Junior Swimming Championships.

In August 2010, representing Israel at the 2010 Summer Youth Olympics, he won the silver medal in the Boys' 100-meter backstroke, finishing a tenth of a second behind the gold medalist at 55.28 seconds. Toumarkin also won a silver medal in the Boys' 200 meter backstroke, at 1:59.39.  It was the third-best-time ever for an Israeli, after times of Guy Barnea and Yoav Gat, and an Israeli youth record.

In November 2010, Toumarkin set the Israeli short course (25 m) record in the 200 meter backstroke (1:53.46) at the European Short Course Swimming Championships in Eindhoven, Netherlands.

In July 2011, at the 2011 World Aquatics Championships in the 200-meter backstroke in Shanghai, China, he set a new Israeli long course (50 m) swimming record (1:58.21 minutes).  Toumarkin said:  "I managed to put all of the pressure out of my mind, and just pretended I was competing in a club competition in Israel."

He thereby qualified to represent Israel at the 2012 Summer Olympics in London. Toumarkin competed for Israel at the 2012 Olympics in the Men's 200 m backstroke and Men's 100 m backstroke.

In August 2015, he set the Israeli national record in the 200m backstroke with a time 1:55.96 minutes while winning the gold medal, and won a gold medal in the 100m backstroke with a time of 53.96 seconds. At the 2015 European Short Course Swimming Championships, he set the 100 IM Israeli national record with a time of 52.75.

Toumarkin competed for Israel at the 2016 Olympics in the Men's 200 m backstroke and Men's 100 m backstroke.

He swam for Israel at the 2017 Maccabiah Games, winning the men’s 200 m backstroke in a time of 2:00.17.

See also
List of Israeli records in swimming
Israel at the Youth Olympics

References

External links
 
 
 
 
 

1992 births
Living people
Israeli people of Russian descent
Israeli people of Soviet descent
Israeli male swimmers
Olympic swimmers of Israel
Maccabiah Games medalists in swimming
Maccabiah Games gold medalists for Israel
Competitors at the 2017 Maccabiah Games
Competitors at the 2022 Maccabiah Games
Swimmers at the 2010 Summer Youth Olympics
Swimmers at the 2012 Summer Olympics
Swimmers at the 2016 Summer Olympics
Swimmers at the 2020 Summer Olympics
Sportspeople from Chelyabinsk
Russian emigrants to Israel
European Aquatics Championships medalists in swimming